Hands on Yello is a remix album by Swiss electronica band Yello, released in 1995.

Track listings

Hands on Yello (CD)

Hands on Yello – The Updates (2xCD)

"The Updates" were released on 26 June 1995 as a limited double CD.

Compared to the 1xCD version, The Updates contains an extra remix by Oliver Lieb, different remixes by The Grid and Plutone, and longer versions of the remixes by Westbam, Jens, Jam & Spoon, Ilsa Gold, Carl Cox and The Orb.

Hands on Yello (vinyl box set)
Box with six 12" vinyls, two slipmats and a booklet, limited to 1000 numbered copies.

world war II

Singles

Westbam's Hands on Yello "Bostich"

Remixed by Klaus Jankuhn & WestBam.The "Video Cut" is a shorter version of the "Machine Mix".

Jam & Spoon's Hands on Yello "You Gotta Say Yes to Another Excess – Great Mission"

Remixed by Jam El Mar & Mark Spoon.Track 3 is a shorter version of track 1, the "Uff die 12-mix".

Plutone's Hands on Yello "Oh Yeah"

Remixed by Plutone.The "Video Edit" is a shorter version of the "Experimental Mix". The version on the Hands on Yello CD is different from the version on the Hands on Yello – the Updates 2xCD, neither are similar to the versions on this single.

Personnel
Artwork by – KM7
Lyrics by – Dieter Meier
Music by – Boris Blank
Photography – Serge Höltschi

References 

Yello albums
1995 remix albums